
Sanok County is a unit of territorial administration and local government (powiat) in Subcarpathian Voivodeship, south-eastern Poland, on the Slovak border. It came into being on January 1, 1999, as a result of the Polish local government reforms passed in 1998.

As of 2019 its total population is 94,473, out of which the population of Sanok is 37,381, that of Zagórz is 5,095, and the rural population is 51,997.

Neighbouring counties
Sanok County is bordered by Krosno County to the west, Brzozów County to the north, Przemyśl County to the north-east and Lesko County to the east. It also borders Slovakia to the south.

Administrative division
The county is subdivided into eight gminas (one urban, one urban-rural and six rural). These are listed in the following table, in descending order of population.

History

Food
About 60% of the land surface of County is given over to agricultural use. However, very little of this is arable land; the vast majority consists of permanent grass pasture or rough grazing for herd animals such as sheep and cows. Although both beef and dairy cattle are raised widely, especially in Odrzechowa, County is more well known for its sheep farming, and thus lamb is the meat traditionally associated with Polish cooking.

Regional dishes

Literature
 Prof. Adam Fastnacht.  Slownik Historyczno-Geograficzny Ziemi Sanockiej w Średniowieczu (Historic-Geographic Dictionary of the Sanok District in the Middle Ages), Kraków, 2002, .

Rural landscape picture

References

 
Sanok